Lawrence Lee Elliot (born March 5, 1938) is an American former professional baseball player. An outfielder, he appeared in 157 Major League games, all but 12 of them for the New York Mets.

As a minor leaguer, Elliot had flashed home run power, hitting 16 homers in both 1958 and 1961, and 25 with the 1959 Wilson Tobs of the Class B Carolina League.

Per the baseball rules then in force, Major League clubs could keep 28 players on their rosters for the first 30 days of the regular season, before cutting down to the 25-man active roster used until September 1. Elliot received the first of his two early-season trials for Pittsburgh in April 1962, and appeared in eight games, including one as the club's starting right fielder, and collecting three hits in ten at bats. In his eighth and final appearance, on May 3, he pinch hit for pitcher Diomedes Olivo and hit a home run off eventual 24-game-winner Jack Sanford of the San Francisco Giants. He then was sent down to the Triple-A Columbus Jets, where he hit 23 more home runs, but batted only .235 in 134 games. On December 16, 1963, the Pirates sold Elliot's contract to the Mets.

Although Elliot spent part of 1964 with the Triple-A Buffalo Bisons, hitting eight homers in 42 games, he spent most of the campaign in the Majors, getting into 80 games and starting 55 contests in center field in relief of Jim Hickman. On August 11, he gained a measure of revenge against his old team when he doubled and homered, drove in two runs, and led the Mets to a 3–2 victory over the Pirates in a game shortened by rain.  Elliot batted only .228 for the Mets, but hit nine homers in 256 at bats.  He then played the entire  season in the minor leagues, but the Mets took some of the sting out of the demotion by loaning Elliot to his hometown San Diego Padres of the Pacific Coast League, the Triple-A affiliate of the Cincinnati Reds.

He started 1966 with the Mets' Jacksonville Suns Triple-A club, batted a career-high .303 with 11 home runs in 73 games, and was recalled to New York in July.  Elliot continued his hot hitting during his early appearances, with a three-hit game (and four RBI) against the Houston Astros on July 18 pushing his batting average to .348.  But, although he started 53 games in corner outfield spots for the Mets through the end of season, his average eventually declined to .246.  Elliot began  with Jacksonville; then, on May 10, the Mets traded him to the Kansas City Athletics in what would be a significant trade for them, as they received in return third baseman Ed Charles. Charles became a prominent member of the 1969 "Miracle Mets" and would be identified with the Mets for many years.  Elliot played three full seasons (1967–1969) at the Triple-A level before retiring.

In his 157 MLB games, Elliot had 103 hits, including 22 doubles, two triples and 15 home runs.

References

External links

1938 births
Living people
Baseball players from San Diego
Buffalo Bisons (minor league) players
Clinton Pirates players
Columbus Jets players
Denver Bears players
Iowa Oaks players
Jacksonville Suns players
Major League Baseball outfielders
New York Mets players
Pittsburgh Pirates players
Salt Lake City Bees players
San Diego Padres (minor league) players
Savannah Pirates players
Seattle Angels players
Vancouver Mounties players
Wilson Tobs players